K34HO-D, virtual and UHF digital channel 34, is a low-powered independent television station licensed to Willmar, Minnesota, United States. The station is owned by UHF-TV Inc., which offers the channel as part of a limited line-up of TV channels to Willmar-area viewers. There are five subchannels on this multiplex, notably including "KOOL-TV", a local programming service also aired in Alexandria on K21GN-D in the Selective TV, Inc., system, as well as two subchannels of KSTC-TV that are unavailable from KSAX-TV.

K34HO was previously affiliated with The Weather Channel and used the WeatherStar 4000 for the Local on the 8s forecasts until the Weather Star 4000 was rendered obsolete in 2014, by which point other free-to-air weather networks were available. UHF-TV now carries competitor WeatherNation TV on sister station K17FA-D.

As of 2021, K34HO carries original programming under the banner KOOL TV, which originates in Alexandria, Minnesota at another cluster of translators, Selective TV, Inc. and is simulcast in Alexandria on K21GN-D. Its programming consists mostly of syndicated shows centered around agriculture, wildlife, rural interest, televangelism and educational children's programming.

External links
KOOL TV official Web site

References

Television channels and stations established in 1988
Low-power television stations in the United States